The National Association of Youth Bowling Clubs (NAYBC) is a British Ten-pin bowling organisation and is responsible to the British Tenpin Bowling Association (BTBA) for organising tenpin bowling for the under 22 year olds.

External links
Official NAYBC website
More information linked from the BTBA website

Bowling organizations
Tenpin bowling in the United Kingdom
Sports organisations of the United Kingdom